New Zealand Rugby Football Union celebrated its Centenary in 1992, which included New Zealand playing three tests against  World XV

First Test

Second Test

Third Test

References

New Zealand national rugby union team matches
1992 in New Zealand rugby union
World XV matches